Nigel B. Church is a British organ builder who was based in Stamfordham, Northumberland from 1971 to 1998.

Career

He started building organs as Church and Company in Stamfordham in 1971 and concentrated on new build organs with mechanical action. 

Although some restorations of older organs were undertaken (mostly in the area around Durham near their workshop) Church's small organ-building company gradually became best known for effective design of small organs (of one or two manuals) in the neo-baroque style then fashionable, often featuring modernist architectural design and casework - in strong contrast to the elaborate, noble and grand post-Victorian aesthetics of most of Britain's organ stock.  As such, the firm's legacy constitutes a modest but important ingredient in the spread of the 20th Century European Organ reform movement into the UK.

The firm ceased trading in 2000.  Many of Church's organs are still in regular use.

Organs built

University of Salford 1972
Episcopal Church, Bearsdon 1972
All Saints' Church, Swallowfield, Bucks 1972
United Reformed Church, Ponteland 1973
St. Anselm Hall, Manchester University 1973
Newcastle Royal Grammar School 1973
All Saints St. Pauls, Walden. Hertfordshire 1974
St Willibrord with All Saints, Newcastle upon Tyne 1974
St Paul's Church, Winlaton, Durham 1974
All Saints' Church, The Oval, Pin Green, Stevenage 1974 
Parish Church of Marske by the Sea, Yorkshire 1975
St Michael's Church, Breaston 1975 now in English Martyrs Church, Alvaston, Derbyshire
St James and St Basil's Church, Fenham, Newcastle upon Tyne 1975
St. James' Church, Scarborough 1976
Martin Luther Church, Newcastle Upon Tyne 1976
The Church of the Holy Saviour, Lemington, Tyne and Wear 1975
Church of St. Mary Magdalene, Hucknall 1976 then at Sedbergh School - now at SS Peter & Paul RC Church, Lincoln 
St George's Church, Hartlepool 1976 
Trent College Chapel, Nottingham 1976
House Organ, Private Residence, Kings Langley 1977
House Organ Private Residence Hertfordshire 1977
St Matthew's Church, Newcastle upon Tyne 1977
St Giles' Church, Sandiacre 1977
St Mary's Church, Disley, Cheshire 1977 
Saxon Church, Escomb, Durham 1977 
King's Hall Newcastle University 1978
St Andrews, Sutton Park, Hull 1978  
St Peter ad Vincula, Thornaby-on-Tees 1978 
St Michael's Church, Coxwold, North Yorkshire 1978 
St Peter and St Paul, Drax Yorkshire 1979
Church of Our Lady and St Columba, Wallsend 1979
St Cuthbert's Redmarshall Co Durham 1979
St Helen's Church, Hoveton, Norfolk 1979
St John of Beverley School, Beverley, Humberside 1979
St Robert of Newminster, Morpeth, Northumberland 1980
Sacred Heart Church, Mukoquee Oklahoma USA 1980
Bryanston School, Dorset 1980 
United Reformed Church, Aston Tirrold, Berkshire 1980 
St Edward the Confessor, Dringhouses, Yorkshire 1980
St Mary's Cathedral, Newcastle upon Tyne 1981 - moved to Ss Mary & Joseph RC church, Poplar, East London in 2012.
St Cuthbert's Roman Catholic School, Newcastle upon Tyne 1981
Church of the Holy Cross, Fenham Newcastle 1981
Houston and Killellan Kirk, Strathclyde 1981
St Joseph's Church, Maidenhead 1981 
St Hugh of Lincoln, Timperley, Greater Manchester 1981 
Hartley Hall of Residence, Royal Northern College of Music, Manchester 1981
St Mary's Church, Harborne, Birmingham 1982
St James' Church, Inverleith Row, Edinburgh 1982
St Mary Magdalene's Church, Trimdon 1982
Box organ, Aberdeen University 1983
Priory Church of St Hilda, Sneaton Castle 1983
St Mary the Virgin, Denham, Buckinghamshire 1983 
Lylesand Church Paisley, Strathclyde 1983
St Alban’s Church, Chester Road, Macclesfield 1983 
Arley Hall Chapel, Cheshire 1983 
Martin Luther Church, Middlesbrough 1984
St George's Church, Wigan 1984
All Saints’ Church, Friern Barnet, London 1984
Liverpool Cathedral 1984
Christ Church, Chilwell 1984
Christ Church Rochester New York. USA 1985
St Paul's Church Geneva New York. USA 1985
Heathfield School, Ascot Berkshire 1985 
St. Andrews Church, Bolam  Northumberland 1985
Box Organ, Private Residence, Kew London 1985  
Holy Trinity Church, Old Bewick 1986 
Barnard Castle School Chapel, Durham 1986 
55 Courthill Avenue, Glasgow 1987 
Chetham's School, Greater Manchester 1987
St Thomas of Aquin and Stephen Harding, Market Drayton 1987
Birmingham Conservatoire 1987
St Joseph's Church, Westgate, Wetherby 1987
Donald Joyce residence, New York 1985

References

British pipe organ builders
Organ builders of the United Kingdom
Year of birth uncertain
Musical instrument manufacturing companies of the United Kingdom
Possibly living people
People from Stamfordham